The following is a list of European power companies by carbon intensity.

List

Units

Production – TWh
Emission – Mt CO2
CO2/MWh – kg

See also 
 Fuel mix disclosure

Notes

Sources 
 https://web.archive.org/web/20120308230538/http://www.pwc.fr/assets/files/pdf/2010/11/pwc_ad_carbon_factor_uk_11_2010_v2.pdf
 https://web.archive.org/web/20120323180737/http://www.pwc.fr/assets/files/pdf/2008/12/pwc_carbon_factor_2008_uk.pdf

Greenhouse gases
Power, European
Electric power companies of Europe
Electric power in the European Union
Climate change in the European Union